John I of Nassau may refer to:

John I, Bishop-Elect of Utrecht (died 1309)
John I, Count of Nassau-Beilstein (died 1473)
John I, Count of Nassau-Siegen (c. 1339–1416)
John I, Count of Nassau-Weilburg (1309–1371)